Joshua Bingham (born 27 December 1994) is an Australian professional footballer who currently plays for Hume City FC. He has previously played for Central Coast Mariners FC, Eastbourne Borough F.C. and Wollongong Wolves FC. Joshua is the son of John Bingham (English footballer).

External links

References

1994 births
Living people
Association football forwards
Central Coast Mariners Academy players
Central Coast Mariners FC players
Eastbourne Borough F.C. players
National Premier Leagues players
A-League Men players
Australian soccer players
People from the Illawarra
Sportsmen from New South Wales
Soccer players from New South Wales